Elbert J. "Al" Butler (July 9, 1938 – July 12, 2000) was an American basketball player who played four seasons in the National Basketball Association (NBA).

Born in Birmingham, Alabama,  he played basketball for East High School in Rochester, New York, before playing collegiately for Niagara University. He was named to the 1961 National Invitation Tournament All-Star team by the Associated Press, despite Niagara losing its only game, 68–71 against Providence.

He was selected by the Boston Celtics in the second round (17th pick overall) of the 1961 NBA draft. He played for the Celtics (1961), New York Knicks (1962–64) and Baltimore Bullets (1964–65) in the NBA for a total of 234 games. He started for the Knicks for Wilt Chamberlain's 100-point game, scoring 8 points.

Butler was the last player to ever wear the number 22 for the Celtics, as they would retire it in honor of Ed Macauley in 1963.

Butler died of cancer on July 12, 2000. After his death, a scholarship was established in his name at Monroe Community College, where he had worked as a guidance counselor.

References

External links

1938 births
2000 deaths
American men's basketball players
Baltimore Bullets (1963–1973) players
Basketball players from New York (state)
Boston Celtics draft picks
Boston Celtics players
Deaths from cancer in the United States
Harrisburg Patriots players
New York Knicks players
Niagara Purple Eagles men's basketball players
Parade High School All-Americans (boys' basketball)
Point guards
Sportspeople from Rochester, New York